Pac-Man VR is a 1996 video game by Virtuality set in the Pac-Man universe.

The game featured play in a 3D environment from a first-person perspective. The game did not change any gameplay mechanics of the original game, except adding a multiplayer feature. The game cabinet itself was expensive, as was play which cost five dollars for five minutes. The cabinet was a 2000 SU series model, where the player stood in a ring set at the waistline. The player could turn his head and a tracking system built into the glasses would detect it and turn Pac-Man's head in the game. Crouching and standing tall were also allowed and movement was done with a joystick.
An adaption for the SU-3000 Systems was released, later on, making Pac-man VR the only non-shooting game ever released for SU-3000 systems.

The promotional page that was originally on Virtuality's web site (which no longer exists), describes the game:

PAC-MAN fever is spreading again with this new fully immersive 3D virtual reality game from Virtuality in which the player actually becomes PAC-MAN himself. Through a licensing agreement with NAMCO, the creators of the original PAC-MAN, Virtuality brings this fun packed game for Solo, Duo and Quattro Series 2000 SU systems.

Retaining all of the original gameplay, Virtuality have enhanced this classic game by networking up to four PAC-MAN characters together, enabling them to see, talk and compete with each in the same virtual maze while still trying to outwit the ghosts.

References

External links
 Mirror of Virtuality's Pac-Man VR Web Site
 PAC-MAN Leaps Into VR; Virtuality Brings PAC-MAN into the Third-Dimension with PAC-MAN VR
 Video introduction to the game
 SU3000 software page

Arcade video games
Arcade-only video games
1996 video games
Pac-Man
Video games developed in the United Kingdom
Virtual reality games
Virtuality games